Dave Armstrong (born 1961) is a New Zealand playwright, screenwriter, trumpet player and columnist for The Dominion Post. His work has featured on stage, radio and television. His television writer credits include Spin Doctors, Seven Periods with Mr Gormsby, Great War Stories, and script editor for bro'Town.
 
Armstrong states:
Just about everything I have learnt about literary and dramatic structure has a parallel in classical music composition. Good dialogue has a rhythm, so if you have a musical ear you can hear it when it works.

Niu Sila
In 2004 Dave Armstrong and Oscar Kightley co-wrote the play Niu Sila, about the friendship between a Samoan and a Palagi boy in 1960s New Zealand. It premiered at Downstage Theatre, and went on to win the 2004 Chapman Tripp Theatre Award for Best New New Zealand Play. In 2006 Armstrong and Oscar Kightley received the Arts Foundation of New Zealand Award for Patronage, for Niu Sila which they co-wrote.  In her New Zealand Listener review of the Auckland Theatre Company production, Natasha Hay called Niu Sila "a triumph." The original "two-hander" play Niu Sila, which is written for 2 actors to play 24 characters,  is published by Playmarket, and The Tutor is published in the same book. In 2007 Armstrong and Kightley adapted the play for schools, so that it can be performed with a large cast. The schools' version was published in 2007 by the New Zealand branch of Cengage Learning, and features study resources and drama activities. Niu Sila is one of the prescribed plays for NCEA (NZ) Level 3 Assessment.

List of plays
 1998 - A Christmas Carol
 1998 – Nitwits
 2004 – Niu Sila, co-written with Oscar Kightley
 2005 – King and Country
 2007 – The Tutor
 2008 – RPM
 2008 – Where We Once Belonged, adapted from the novel by Sia Figiel
 2009 – Le Sud
 2009 – Kia ora Khalid
 2011 – The Motor Camp, based on a story by director Danny Mulheron
 2011 – Rita and Douglas
 2012 – Magnolia Street
 2013 – Kings of the Gym
 2015 – Central
 2015 - Anzac Eve
 2020 - The Surprise Party

Awards
 1995 – New Zealand Film and Television Awards – nominated, Best Television Script – Drama/Comedy, Skitz
 2003 – New Zealand Television Awards – winner, Best Script – Comedy, Spin Doctors, Series 3
 2004 – Chapman Tripp Theatre Awards, winner Best New New Zealand Play, Niu Sila
 2005 – Chapman Tripp Theatre Awards, winner Best New New Zealand Play, The Tutor
 2006 – Air New Zealand Screen Awards – nominated, Best Script – Comedy, Seven Periods with Mister Grimsby
 2006 – Arts Foundation Award for Patronage (co-awarded with Oscar Kightley)
 2008 – Chapman Tripp Theatre Awards, winner Best New New Zealand Play, Where We Once Belonged
 2008 – Radio Awards, Best Dramatic Production, King and Country
 2014 – SWANZ Scriptwriter Awards - nominated for Best Television Drama Episode for Hope and Wire, Episode Five

References

1961 births
Living people
New Zealand columnists
20th-century New Zealand dramatists and playwrights
21st-century New Zealand dramatists and playwrights
New Zealand male dramatists and playwrights